Dragan Tešanović (born September 2, 1985) is a Serbian retired mixed martial arts (MMA) fighter who competes in the middleweight division. A professional MMA competitor since 2007, Tešanović mostly competed in the Eastern European circuit, before signing with the Bellator Fighting Championships.

Mixed martial arts career

Background and early career

Tešanović is regarded as a well-rounded fighter, due to his "solid stand-up, great ground work and dangerous clinch game." Tešanović often utilises "soccer kicks" in fights, drawing on his footballing background.

In addition to his professional MMA career, Tešanović has placed first in five Serbian submission fighting competitions. He also holds a 5–1 record in amateur MMA and has been training since the age of 19.

In 2009, Tešanović was named as the sixth top prospect in Europe by Sherdog.

Tešanović's early career saw him compile a perfect 7–0 record, with three first round stoppages. Amongst this record was a decision victory over Antoni Chmielewski after dominating with knee strikes and effective takedown defence.

Tešanović was scheduled to make his English debut in December 2009 against Papy Abedi, though the fight never took place as Tešanović withdrew. His final appearance in his early career was against Gregor Herb. Tešanović won the fight via decision.

Bellator Fighting Championships

In August 2010, Tešanović signed with Bellator. Bellator CEO Bjorn Rebney stated that "Dragan Tešanović has tremendous potential to become a dominant middleweight" and that "his diverse training regime and quickly progressing skill-set set the table for him to make substantial impact in our 185 division".

Later, Tešanović signed to participate in his debut for the promotion. His opponent was named as Mike Bernhard, with the fight taking place at Bellator 34. Tešanović's previous seven fights have been held in Bulgaria, Serbia and Slovenia, making his Bellator 34 fight in Hollywood, Florida his North American debut.  He lost the fight via unanimous decision (27–30, 28–29, 28–29).

Mixed martial arts record

|-
|Win
|align=center|8-2
| Matteo Minonzio
|TKO (knee)
|TFC - Tesla Fighting Championship 2
|
|align=center|1
|align=center|2:30
|Belgrade, Serbia
|
|-
|Loss
|align=center|7-2
| Svetoslav Savov
|Submission (guillotine choke) 
|WFC 13 - Heavy Hitters
|
|align=center|2
|align=center|N/A
|Belgrade, Serbia
|
|-
|Loss
|align=center|7-1
| Mike Bernhard
|Decision (unanimous)
|Bellator 34
|
|align=center|3
|align=center|5:00
|Hollywood, Florida, United States
|
|-
|Win
|align=center|7-0
| Gregor Herb
|Decision (unanimous)
|WFC 11 - Bash at the Beach
|
|align=center|3
|align=center|5:00
|Portorož, Slovenia
|
|-
|Win
|align=center|6-0
| Markus Di Gallo
|TKO (punch)
|WFC 10 - Night of Champions
|
|align=center|2
|align=center|3:43
|Ljubljana, Slovenia
|
|-
|Win
|align=center|5-0
| Matus Laincz
|TKO (punches)
|Ultra FC - Stop the Crime
|
|align=center|2
|align=center|4:31
|Subotica, Serbia
|
|-
|Win
|align=center|4-0
| Antoni Chmielewski
|Decision (unanimous)
|WFC 6 - Relentless
|
|align=center|3
|align=center|5:00
|Sofia, Bulgaria
|
|-
|Win
|align=center|3-0
| Saša Mitrović
|TKO (punches)
|Memorijal Gidra Stojanović
|
|align=center|1
|align=center|N/A
|Belgrade, Serbia
|
|-
|Win
|align=center|2-0
| Mihaly Dobrai
|TKO (punches)
|Ultimate Fight - Čačak
|
|align=center|1
|align=center|N/A
|Čačak, Serbia
|
|-
|Win
|align=center|1-0
| Bojan Vojnović
|TKO (punches)
|Memorijal Gidra Stojanović
|
|align=center|1
|align=center|2:49
|Belgrade, Serbia
|

Except where otherwise indicated, details provided in the record box are taken from Sherdog.

References

External links
 

1985 births
Living people
Serbian male mixed martial artists
Middleweight mixed martial artists
Sportspeople from Belgrade
Place of birth missing (living people)